Utica may refer to:

Places
Utica, Tunisia, ancient city founded by Phoenicians
Útica, a village in Cundinamarca, Colombia
Port Perry/Utica Field Aerodrome, Canada

United States
Utica, New York
Utica Mansion, in Angels Camp, California
North Utica, Illinois, usually called "Utica, Illinois"
Utica Bridge
Utica station (Illinois)
Utica Township, LaSalle County, Illinois
Utica, Indiana
Utica Township, Clark County, Indiana
Utica Township, Chickasaw County, Iowa
Utica, Kansas
Utica, Kentucky
Utica, Maryland
Utica, Michigan
Utica, Minnesota
Utica Township, Winona County, Minnesota
Utica, Mississippi
Utica, Missouri
Utica, Montana
Utica, Nebraska
Utica, Ohio, in Licking County on the Knox County line
Utica, Warren County, Ohio
Utica, Oklahoma
Utica Square, in Tulsa, Oklahoma
Utica, Pennsylvania
Utica, South Carolina
Utica, South Dakota
Utica, Texas, a ghost town in Smith County, Texas
Utica, West Virginia
Utica, Crawford County, Wisconsin, a town of which Fairview, Pine Knob, Rising Sun, and Towerville are a part
Utica, Dane County, Wisconsin, a part of the town of Christiana
Utica, Winnebago County, Wisconsin, a town of which Elo, Fisk, and Pickett are a part

Gastronomy 
Utica greens, a dish
Utica riggies, a dish
Utica Club, a beer by Matt Brewing Company

Media and arts 
Utica, an episode of the television series Rome
Catone in Utica, an opera by Metastasio for Leonardo Vinci
Utica Queen, a contestant on Season 13 of Rupaul's Drag Race

Organizations 
Tunisian Confederation of Industry, Trade and Handicrafts, an employers' organization with acronym UTICA in French
Utica College, formerly part of Syracuse University
Utica Energy, fuel plant in Oshkosh, Wisconsin
Hotel Utica, New York

Science 
 Utica, a genus of crabs in the family Varunidae
 Utica, a genus of butterflies in the family Lycaenidae; synonym of Theclinesthes
Pseudohemihyalea utica, a moth
Pheia utica, a moth
Utica Shale, a rock layer of shale in the Appalachian Basin

Other 
Nicolae Uțica, Moldovan politician
Dean v. Utica, a legal case

See also 
Utica Avenue (disambiguation)
Utica Station (disambiguation)
Utica Township (disambiguation)